Brown Mountain is a mountain in Cumberland County, Tennessee, west of Knoxville and north of Chattanooga. Nearby peaks include Buzard Hill, Wise Hill, High Point, Betsy Mountain, Johnson Mountain, and Nichols Mountain.

See also
Crab Orchard Mountains

References

Mountains of Tennessee